Deer Woman, sometimes known as the Deer Lady, is a spirit in Native American mythology whose associations and qualities vary, depending on situation and relationships. To women, children, and men who are respectful of women and children, she is associated with fertility and love. However, to those who have harmed women and children, she is vengeful and murderous, and known to lure these men to their deaths. She appears as either a beautiful young woman with deer feet or a deer.

In Native American traditions
Deer Woman stories are found in multiple Indigenous American cultures, often told to young children or by young adults and preteens in the communities of the Oceti Sakowin, Ojibwe, Ponca, Omaha, Cherokee, Muscogee, Seminole, Choctaw, Otoe, Osage, Pawnee, and the Iroquois - and those are only the ones that have documented Deer Woman sightings.

Some stories and traditions describe the sighting of Deer Woman as a sign of personal transformation or as a warning. Deer Woman is said to be fond of dancing and will sometimes join a communal dance unnoticed, leaving only when the drum beating ceases.

Similar creatures
The Deer Women show characteristics and traits of both sirens and succubi. The siren, according to the Theoi Project, are monstrous sea nymphs that lure men to their deaths with their song. Succubi, as defined by the Merriam-Webster dictionary, are "demons who take female form who have sexual intercourse with men in their sleep"; constant contact with a succubus can result in failing health or death for the man.

Fiura, of the Chiloé region of Chile, causes deformation in anyone who looks upon her and will cast spells to confuse young woodsmen into sleeping with her.
La Patasola, literally "one footed", is a shape-shifter from the Antioquia region of Colombia who takes the form of a beautiful woman to lure men with her cries of fear; when the men (who are often causing harm in one way or another to the rain forest) come to her, she drops her beautiful mask and slaughters them in an effort to protect the forest.

La Tunda, another nature spirit from Colombia, lures people of all walks of life to them with their song and then drains them of blood; La Tunda can also shape-shift, but she will always have a single leg of a molinillo that she is very careful to hide.

The Brazilian Iara are beautiful warrior mermaids who, when found by a man,  will charm him with her voice and beauty and either drown him, or turn him into something like her and make him her lover. La Llorona ("the crier"), who is found in Mexico and the Southwest United States, is a female ghost who will kidnap the souls of children, effectively killing them, and whose cries bring irrevocable sorrow.  Sighting La Llorona spells death for someone within the week.

While all these spirits will lure away and/or hurt others, they also have various physical oddities. The Deer Woman has hooves. Sirens are bird from the chest down. Succubi were originally portrayed as hideous and demonic.  La Patasola has no right leg from the pelvis down and her right breast is fused to her arm.

In popular culture
 The Deer Woman was featured as a character in an eponymous episode of the Showtime horror series Masters of Horror. It originally aired in North America on December 9, 2005, and was directed by John Landis.
The Monster High series introduced the character Isi Dawndancer in 2015. The character is inspired by the Deer Woman myth; her name, Isi, means deer in the Choctaw language.
In 2015, Anishinaabe writer Elizabeth LaPensée wrote Deer Woman: A Vignette.
In 2019, Rebecca Roanhorse wrote the short story "Harvest" in the New Suns: Original Speculative Fiction by People of Color anthology, which features a seductive Deer Woman harvesting hearts in the name of justice. 
In 2019, Carmen Maria Machado and Dani included Deer Woman in their horror comic The Low, Low Woods. Published by DC Black Label and Hill House Comics. 
In 2020, Blackfeet author Stephen Graham Jones published The Only Good Indians, which features a vengeful Elk Head Woman which is based on Deer Woman legends.
In 2021 and 2022, the Deer Lady, portrayed by Kaniehtiio Horn, is a recurring character on Reservation Dogs on Hulu. A "badass vigilante who only goes after 'bad men'" she has an ongoing, even lifelong, relationship with several characters in the community portrayed in the show, intervening in their lives in times of crisis. She appears in S1 Ep5, “Come and Get Your Love” and S2 Ep8, "This is Where the Plot Thickens".

References

External links
‘Deer Woman: An Anthology’ Sheds Light on Violence Against Native Women in North America

Legendary creatures of the indigenous peoples of North America
Iroquois legendary creatures
Cherokee legendary creatures
Ojibwe legendary creatures
Mythological human hybrids
Mythological deer
Anthropomorphic mammals
Female legendary creatures